The Happy Time is a 1952 American comedy-drama film directed by the award-winning director Richard Fleischer, based on the 1945 novel of the same name by Robert Fontaine, which Samuel A. Taylor turned into a hit play. A boy, played by Bobby Driscoll, comes of age in a close-knit French-Canadian family. The film stars Charles Boyer and Louis Jourdan as his father and uncle respectively. The play was also adapted into a musical in 1967 by composer John Kander, lyricist Fred Ebb, and librettist N. Richard Nash, and starred Robert Goulet.

Plot
Young Robert "Bibi" Bonnard (Bobby Driscoll) grows up in Ottawa, Ontario, with his parents, Jacques (Charles Boyer) and Susan (Marsha Hunt), and his roving rogue of a grandfather, Grandpere (Marcel Dalio). Across the street is his uncle, amiable drunkard Louis (Kurt Kasznar), who ignores the complaints of his hard-working dressmaker wife Felice (Jeanette Nolan) and her worries about the future of their daughter Yvonne. Louis agitates about meeting his prospective son-in-law, Alfred Grattin, a teetotaler bank clerk who wishes to marry Yvonne.  Next-door neighbour and schoolmate Peggy O'Hare (Marlene Cameron) has a crush on Bibi, but he is as yet too young to understand.

On his birthday, Bibi is taken to see the vaudeville acts at the theatre where his violinist / conductor father works. During the magic act, the Great Gaspari tries to steal a kiss from Mignonette Chappuis (Linda Christian), the assistant he is in the process of sawing in half. She storms offstage and quits. Jacques offers her a job as a maid, which she gladly accepts. Bibi is intrigued, but a little confused about his feelings for the new addition to the household. Equally fascinated, but not at all perplexed as to why is another unexpected arrival, Uncle Desmonde (Louis Jourdan), a traveling salesman and notorious ladies' man. He has been summoned back to take the place of the recently deceased sales manager, though he informs his employer it is only until a replacement can be found.

Uncle Desmonde starts courting Mignonette, but though she is attracted to him, she tells him she is fed up with living on the road and wants to settle down. He shows her the picture of a lovely house he expects to inherit, weakening her resistance.

Meanwhile, Peggy becomes jealous of Bibi's attentions to Mignonette. Bibi has already gotten into trouble for bringing La Vie Parisienne to school. When a dirty picture is found by the principal, Mr. Frye, Peggy falsely claims she saw Bibi draw it. Bibi denies it, angering Frye. He straps Bibi on the hand three times, and tells him it will be repeated every day until he confesses. When the adult Bonnards find out, they see Frye and straighten him out, though with great difficulty.

When they return in triumph, Desmonde discovers that Mignonette has quit after finding out that he lied about the house, and because she is under the impression that he has been sneaking into her bedroom and stealing kisses when she is asleep. Bibi confesses that he is the guilty party. Desmonde then realizes that Mignonette is not like all of his other women. He finds her and they become engaged.

The adults explain Peggy's behavior to Bibi. To Peggy's delight, Bibi forgives her and makes her his girl. Then his voice breaks.

Cast
 Charles Boyer as Jacques Bonnard
 Louis Jourdan as Uncle Desmonde Bonnard 
 Marsha Hunt as Susan Bonnard
 Kurt Kasznar as Uncle Louis Bonnard
 Linda Christian as Mignonette Chappuis
 Marcel Dalio as Grandpere Bonnard
 Jeanette Nolan as Felice Bonnard
 Jack Raine as Mr. Frye
 Richard Erdman as Alfred Grattin, 
 Marlene Cameron as Peggy O'Hare
 Gene Collins as Jimmy Bishop
 Bobby Driscoll as Robert "Bibi" Bonnard

Production
Richard Fleischer had previously worked with Stanley Kramer and Carl Foreman on So This is New York. They borrowed Fleischer from RKO after the director had some additional reshoots on His Kind of Woman. Fleischer brought with him his regular writer, Earl Felton. He says Kurt Kasznar wanted too much money to reprise his Broadway performance so Kramer and Fleischer cast Zero Mostel instead. However then Harry Cohn became aware of the casting and overruled it - as Mostel was politically suspect due to communist sympathies. Kasznar was cast.

References

External links
 
 
 
 
 

1952 films
American coming-of-age comedy-drama films
American black-and-white films
Columbia Pictures films
1950s English-language films
Films scored by Dimitri Tiomkin
American films based on plays
Films directed by Richard Fleischer
Films set in Ottawa
1950s French-language films
1952 comedy-drama films
1950s American films